The Other Woman (German: Die Andere) is a 1924 German silent drama film directed by Gerhard Lamprecht and starring Xenia Desni, Fritz Alberti and Hildegard Imhof.

The film's sets were designed by the art director Hans Jacoby. It was shot at the Babelsberg Studios in Berlin and on location in a variety of locations including Nice, Southampton and Tangier.

Cast
 Xenia Desni as Georgette  
 Fritz Alberti as Mills  
 Elsie Fuller as Blanche  
 Hugo Werner-Kahle as Jan Terbrooch  
 Didier Aslan as Von Soria 
 Hildegard Imhof 
 Lina Paulsen 
 Franz Schönfeld 
 Gustav Adolf Semler

References

Bibliography
 Grange, William. Cultural Chronicle of the Weimar Republic. Scarecrow Press, 2008.

External links

1924 films
Films of the Weimar Republic
Films directed by Gerhard Lamprecht
German silent feature films
UFA GmbH films
German black-and-white films
Films shot in Nice
German drama films
1924 drama films
Films shot at Babelsberg Studios
Silent drama films
1920s German films
1920s German-language films